"Suds in the Bucket" is a song written by Billy Montana and Tammy Wagoner and recorded by American country music singer Sara Evans.  It was released in May 2004 as the third single from Evans' 2003 album Restless.  It became her third number-one single on the US Country charts, and her first since "Born to Fly" in early 2001.  It was certified Gold by the RIAA on November 18, 2005.

The song appears in the game Karaoke Revolution Country and is included in the Rock Band: Country Track Pack. It was presented as well by contestant Brennley Brown on The Voice on May 15, 2017.

Content
This up-tempo song tells the story of a girl who abruptly runs off to Las Vegas one day with her boyfriend, leaving the "suds in the bucket and the clothes hangin' out on the line," noting how quickly it happened. The gossip and drama then spreads to other parts of their hometown, like a hair salon and the local church.

Critical reception
Deborah Evans Price, of Billboard magazine reviewed the song favorably, saying that it is "awash in fiddle and steel guitar and has a catchy chorus." She goes on to call the lyric "cute and will remind all parents of the fleeting joys of childhood and how quickly the kids begin building their own lives."

Music video
The music video follows the lyrics of the song. It shows a young girl running away from home with a boy to go get married. The song is intercut with scenes of Evans singing in front of laundry drying in the front yard of a home, in a beauty shop, and in a church. The video was directed by Peter Zavadil.

Chart performance

Year-end charts

Certifications

References

2004 singles
Sara Evans songs
Songs written by Billy Montana
Music videos directed by Peter Zavadil
Song recordings produced by Paul Worley
RCA Records Nashville singles
2003 songs